Youri is a small town and urban commune in the Cercle of Nioro du Sahel in the Kayes Region of southwestern Mali. In the 2009 census the commune had a population of 6,721.

References

Communes of Kayes Region